Zard Kuhi (also Romanized as Zard Kūhī; also known as Zard Kūh) is a village in Bashtin Rural District, Bashtin District, Davarzan County, Razavi Khorasan Province, Iran. At the 2006 census, its population was 127, in 46 families.

References 

Populated places in Davarzan County